Joy Carroll is an English priest who was one of the first women to be ordained as a priest in the Church of England in 1994. She worked in London as a vicar for 10 years. She was adviser, inspiration, and role model for Richard Curtis for his comedy television series The Vicar of Dibley. Her book, Beneath the Cassock: the Real-life Vicar of Dibley describes her life as a vicar. Since moving to the United States, she has become licensed as a priest in the Episcopal Church.

Personal life
In 1997 she married American theologian and writer Jim Wallis, and now lives in the US. She uses the name Joy Carroll Wallis. She has published an autobiography, The Woman Behind the Collar. She has two sons, Luke and Jack, with Wallis.

Publications
 "The Importance of The Vicar of Dibley"

References

 

1959 births
20th-century English Anglican priests
21st-century English Anglican priests
Alumni of Plymouth Marjon University
American Episcopal priests
Date of birth missing (living people)
English expatriates in the United States
Living people
Women Anglican clergy
People from London
People from Washington, D.C.
Place of birth missing (living people)
20th-century American clergy
21st-century American clergy